Manolescu (German: Manolescu - Der König der Hochstapler) is a 1929 German silent film directed by Viktor Tourjansky and starring Ivan Mozzhukhin, Brigitte Helm and Heinrich George.

The film's sets were designed by the art director Robert Herlth and Walter Röhrig. It was shot at the Babelsberg Studios in Berlin and on location in St. Moritz and Monte Carlo.

Cast
 Ivan Mozzhukhin as Manolescu  
 Brigitte Helm as Cleo  
 Heinrich George as Jack  
 Dita Parlo as Jeanette  
 Harry Hardt 
 Max Wogritsch 
 Valy Arnheim 
 Elsa Wagner 
 Fritz Alberti 
 Boris de Fast 
 Lya Christy 
 Fred Goebel
 Franz Verdier
 Michael von Newlinsky

See also
 Manolescu's Memoirs (1920)
 Manolescu, Prince of Thieves (1933)

References

Bibliography
 Goble, Alan. The Complete Index to Literary Sources in Film. Walter de Gruyter, 1999.

External links

1929 films
1920s biographical films
1920s crime comedy films
1920s heist films
German biographical films
Films of the Weimar Republic
Films directed by Victor Tourjansky
German silent feature films
German crime comedy films
German heist films
Films about con artists
Biographical films about criminals
UFA GmbH films
German black-and-white films
Films shot at Babelsberg Studios
1929 comedy films
Silent crime comedy films
1920s German films
1920s German-language films